Goulburn Watsford (1 July 1859 – 16 May 1951) was an Australian cricketer. He played one first-class cricket match for South Australia in 1882/83 and one match for Victoria in 1886.

See also
 List of South Australian representative cricketers
 List of Victoria first-class cricketers

References

External links
 

1859 births
1951 deaths
Australian cricketers
South Australia cricketers
Victoria cricketers
People from Goulburn
Cricketers from New South Wales